Spaghetti Warehouse is an Italian restaurant chain geared towards families with five locations in two U.S. states: four in Ohio and one in New York. The chain started in 1972 in Dallas, Texas, and at one point had spread throughout the southern and eastern parts of the United States. Each restaurant has a trolley car in the dining room and patrons are able to sit in the car. One of Spaghetti Warehouse's unique characteristics is that many of the older locations are in renovated, historic buildings.

The location in Columbus, Ohio, which opened in 1978, is the largest both in seating capacity and in sales. The Columbus location seats approximately 800 people.

Spaghetti Warehouse, Inc., was acquired in 1998 by Consolidated Restaurant Cos. (a holding company of the private equity firm Cracken, Harkey & Co. L.L.C.). In June 2007, Consolidated Restaurants sold the chain to the Los Angeles-based investment firm Frandeli, Inc.

The Old Spaghetti Factory, which started in 1969, has a very similar format; as does Houston, Texas-based Warehouse 72.

Locations

Dallas, Texas (closed) 

The original location, in the West End of Dallas, Texas, opened in 1972. The building was built in 1891 and served as a pillow factory for much of its history. The 3rd largest location in the chain, including two floors and private dining rooms, it was credited as the first restaurant-retail business in the neighbourhood that spurred the rebirth of the West End area of Downtown Dallas in the 1970s and 80s. It was home to many former brass bed headboards, an old confessional, and the headboard and footboard of a bed that belonged to Stephen F. Austin, which is now a booth that fits up to 8 people. An original East Dallas trolley car was in the main dining room.  In October 2019, the location was shut down after 47 years.

Austin, Texas (closed) 

The Austin location was the third location in the chain's history. Opened in 1975, and built in 1902, it used to be a grocery warehouse, and during prohibition, was a brothel. Two chandeliers from New York City's Penn Station resided there as well as the original box office from Grauman's Chinese Theatre in Los Angeles, California.  Like its Dallas counterpart, it was also home to an original East Dallas trolley car.  The Austin location closed on April 23, 2011, due to physical building issues.

Columbus, Ohio (closed for repair) 
The Columbus location was the first Spaghetti Warehouse outside of Texas, and the fifth to open in the chain.  It opened in April 1978 in an old ice house built in 1891. It is the largest in the company at 20,000 square feet and continually exceeds its counterparts in weekly sales. Located in the Franklinton area of Columbus, adjacent to its downtown district, it is a landmark in Columbus; many diners believe it to be the only location. In addition to the obligatory trolley car, it is home to two confessionals taken from churches in New England, as well as a 1920s German elevator in which patrons may sit for dinner. The original steam engine that kept the building cold when it was an ice house is still located in its lobby. Another artifact there is the head of a moose killed by former President Theodore Roosevelt, along with its certificate of authenticity.

On March 18, 2022, the 3-story Spaghetti Warehouse building in Columbus was evacuated after a partial roof collapse. The Columbus fire chief reported that the main support of the building's roof, which he described as the roof joist, collapsed. No injuries were reported, but the building was closed as unsafe until an inspection could be performed and the structure repaired if possible. The building, which has seven dining rooms and seats up to 800 patrons, had been renovated as recently as 2021.

Akron, Ohio 

The Akron location opened in 1992 on the site of a former B. F. Goodrich Corporation warehouse, adjacent to the former B. F. Goodrich Corporation Headquarters which closed in 1988. The building was originally built in the 1870s as a warehouse for B.F. Goodrich tires. The Akron store features a 20-foot chandelier that once belonged to the  Dunes Hotel & Casino in Las Vegas, Nevada. This location features several signs of former rubber tire companies (B. F. Goodrich Corporation, Firestone Tire and Rubber Company, General Tire, and Goodyear Tire & Rubber Company) that once called Akron home, as well as old arcade games and antiques. Diners can sit in an old hotel elevator, and a former Akron street trolley car. Although it is not one of the original warehouse type stores from the 1970s and 1980s, it is in a historical building in a historical area adjacent to the former B. F. Goodrich Corporation Headquarters.

Memphis, Tennessee (closed) 
The Memphis location was inside a typical warehouse of the late 19th to early 20th century. It was decorated with an original trolley used for transportation in downtown Memphis, and with doors and light fixtures from Memphis Union Station which had been abandoned and razed in 1968 to make way for a new post office. When Elvis Presley returned from the Army on March 7, 1960, he was greeted in Memphis Union Station by a crowd of several hundred fans. The restaurant closed in mid-November 2017 after 30 years of service.

Houston, Texas (closed)

The Houston location was the company's second location and the second largest, after Columbus, Ohio. It opened in 1973 in Downtown Houston. Like the Dallas location, it had two floors of dining. During lunch, guests were seated in a trolley structure for their meal.

In late August 2017, Hurricane Harvey forced the restaurant to close as a result of water seeping through the top of the main floor, causing significant damage. It reopened in August 2019 as Warehouse 72/Butcher's Plates & Pizza, at the Marq*E Entertainment Center. The former site will become a McIntyre's bar upon renovation.

Ybor City, Tampa, Florida (closed)
The Tampa store was located in the former tobacco storage warehouse of the Ybor Factory Building in the historic neighborhood of Ybor City. The building was constructed in 1886 and was the largest cigar factory in the world at the time. The walls and floors of the restaurant consisted mainly of original exposed brick, and a replica of an Ybor City street car was located inside the main dining room. On March 4, 2016, it was announced this location would be closing. However, five days later the parent brand, BLD Brands, stated the location would remain open for another full year while another location is scouted. By October 2 the restaurant was out of business as efforts to save the building and relocate it were moot.

Little Rock, Arkansas (closed)

The Little Rock location opened on October 14, 1990, housed in the former Chicago, Rock Island and Pacific Railway passenger station.  This historic building had opened in 1901 as the Choctaw Route station, but had been vacant since 1968, after being purchased by the preservation minded owners of the Arkansas Gazette.  At the time this Spaghetti Warehouse location opened, it was reported to be the company's most expensive renovation to date, and part of the dining area also include a 1924 Pullman car, originally named Mt. Sheridan, which had been used by the Cotton Belt Railroad.  Spaghetti Warehouse also acquired a neighboring antebellum mansion, the Alexander George house, which had previously served as a division headquarters for Rock Island.  For four years, Spaghetti Warehouse worked with local preservationists in an effort to save this structure, which was finally razed in 1994, having been deemed by engineers to be too dangerous. The slow pace of downtown Little Rock redevelopment doomed the restaurant, and this location was closed on February 4, 1996.  The former passenger station building is today part of the Clinton Presidential Center.

Norfolk, Virginia (closed)

The Norfolk location opened in 1991 and closed in 2001. It was housed in the Southern Bagging Company building, listed on the National Register of Historic Places in 2007.

Tulsa, Oklahoma (closed)

The Tulsa location opened in the historic Brady Arts District in 1992 and closed in late March 2017.

Syracuse, New York

The Syracuse location opened in 1989 in a factory building that was originally built by L.B. Doman in 1909 for his Amphion Piano Player Company (moving it from Elbridge, New York). The building was later used as a pocketbook factory (Julius Resnick, Inc.) and then as a bakery warehouse before being acquired by the restaurant chain.

Current locations

 Syracuse, New York
 Akron, Ohio
 Columbus, Ohio
 Dayton, Ohio
 Toledo, Ohio

Past locations

 Little Rock, Arkansas
 Hartford, Connecticut
 Fort Lauderdale, Florida
 Tampa, Florida
 Marietta, Georgia
 Aurora, Illinois
 Elk Grove Village, Illinois
 South Bend, Indiana
 Northampton, Massachusetts
 Springfield, Massachusetts
 Kansas City, Missouri
 Buffalo, New York
 Rochester, New York
 Charlotte, North Carolina
 Cleveland, Ohio
 Oklahoma City, Oklahoma
Tulsa, Oklahoma
Philadelphia, Pennsylvania
 Pittsburgh, Pennsylvania
 Providence, Rhode Island
 Columbia, South Carolina
 Greenville, South Carolina
 Knoxville, Tennessee
 Memphis, Tennessee
 Abilene, Texas
 Addison, Texas
 Arlington, Texas
 Austin, Texas
 Bedford, Texas
 Corpus Christi, Texas
 Dallas, Texas
 Fort Worth, Texas
 Houston, Texas
 Irving, Texas
 Mesquite, Texas
 Plano, Texas
 San Antonio, Texas
 Stafford, Texas
 Willowbrook, Texas
 Glen Allen, Virginia
 Newport News, Virginia
 Norfolk, Virginia
 Richmond, Virginia
 Seattle, Washington

TV commercials

Theme song
In 2013, the chain attracted media attention for releasing a track called "Spaghetti Warehouse Theme Song," which some considered to be humorous.

See also
 List of Italian restaurants

References

External links
 
 Warehouse 72 site
 Consolidated Restaurant Operations former operating company for CRC.
 Current Spaghetti Warehouse Parent Company

Restaurants established in 1972
Italian-American cuisine
Italian-American culture in Texas
Italian restaurants
Regional restaurant chains in the United States
Restaurants in Dallas
American companies established in 1972
1972 establishments in Texas